Dag Prawitz (born 1936, Stockholm) is a Swedish philosopher and logician.  He is best known for his work on proof theory and the foundations of natural deduction.

Prawitz is a member of the Norwegian Academy of Science and Letters, of the Royal Swedish Academy of Letters and Antiquity and the Royal Swedish Academy of Science.

Prawitz was awarded the Rolf Schock Prize in Logic and Philosophy in 2020.

References

External links
 Prawitz's web page at Stockholm University

1936 births
Living people
Swedish logicians
Mathematical logicians
Swedish philosophers
Members of the Royal Swedish Academy of Sciences
Members of the Norwegian Academy of Science and Letters
Proof theorists
20th-century Swedish  philosophers